John Brereton (c. 1571/1572 – c. 1632) was a gentleman adventurer and chronicler of the 1602 voyage to the New World led by Bartholomew Gosnold.

Brereton recorded the first European exploration of Cape Cod and its environs. His account, published in 1602, helped promote the possibilities of English colonisation in what was then known as "the North part of Virginia" and would later become known as New England.

Life
Twentieth century historians such as David Beers Quinn have identified Brereton as a clergyman who was born and lived in East Anglia. The son of Cuthbert Brereton, a sheriff of Norwich, he was born around 1571/72 and was educated at Norwich School, before being admitted as a pensioner at Gonville and Caius College, Cambridge aged seventeen on 17 January 1589. He graduated with a Bachelor of Arts degree in 1593, and proceeded to Master of Arts by seniority in 1596. He took holy orders, being ordained deacon priest by the Bishop of Norwich and in 1598 was appointed curate of Lawshall, Suffolk.

It was probably through this appointment in Suffolk that Brereton came into contact with Gosnold, who lived nearby, and also with the notable Elizabethan author, Richard Hakluyt, who had published numerous accounts of travels and voyages of discovery, especially in America.

With Gosnold, Brereton undertook a voyage to Virginia, as it then was. On his return to England and after the publication of his account, he appears to have lived a quiet life in holy orders, becoming Rector of Brightwell, Suffolk, in 1619, and probably he is the same man who became Rector of St Peter Mancroft in Norwich and who died in 1632.

The voyage and exploration of New England
Brereton joined Captain Bartholomew Gosnold, Bartholomew Gilbert, Gabriel Archer, and others to make the first English attempt to settle in the land since called New England. Twenty-four gentlemen and eight sailors left Falmouth in a small Dartmouth bark, the Concord, on 26 March 1602, twelve of the gentlemen intending to settle, while twelve others were to return home with the produce of the land and of their trading with the natives.

Instead of making the circuitous route by the Canary Islands, Gosnold steered, as the winds permitted, due west, only southing towards the Azores, and was the first to accomplish a direct course to America, saving the better part of a thousand leagues. By 15 May the voyagers made the headland which they named Cape Cod. Here Gosnold, Brereton, and two others went ashore on the white sands, the first spot in New England ever trodden by English feet. Doubling the Cape and passing Nantucket, they touched at Martha's Vineyard, and passing round Dover Cliff entered Buzzard's Bay, which they called Gosnold's Hope, reached the island of Cuttyhunk, which they named Elizabeth's Island. Here they determined to settle; in nineteen days they built a fort and storehouse in an islet in the centre of a lake of three miles compass, and began to trade with the natives in furs, skins, and the sassafras plant. They sowed wheat, barley, and peas, and in fourteen days the young plants had sprung nine inches and more. The country was fruitful in the extreme. It was decided, however, that so small a company would be useless for colonisation; their provisions, after division, would have lasted only six weeks. The whole company therefore sailed for England, making a very short voyage of five weeks, and landed at Exmouth on 23 July. Their freight realised a great profit, the sassafras alone selling for £336 a ton.

The published account
Brereton wrote A Briefe Relation of the Description of Elizabeth's Ile, and some others towards the North Part of Virginie, written by John Brierton, one of the Voyage, which was published in London in 1602. A second impression was published the same year entitled A brief and true Relation of the Discovery of the North Part of Virginia, written by John Brereton, one of the Voyage. To this edition is added A Treatise of M. Edward Hayes, containing important inducements for the planting in these parts.

Brereton's well-written and concise account was designed to promote the possibilities of colonisation of New England. There were no fewer than twenty three Atlantic crossings in nine separate voyages by one or two ships over the next six years.

Captain John Smith, in his Adventures and Discourses, speaks of Master John Brereton and his account of his voyage as fairly turning his brains, and impelling him to cast in his lot with Gosnold and Wingfield, and make that subsequent voyage which resulted in the planting and colonisation of Virginia in 1607.

Bibliography
Baigent, Elizabeth: John Brereton, in Oxford Dictionary of National Biography, 2004
Gookin, Warner F. and  Barbour, Phillip Bartholomew Gosnold – Discoverer and Planter, Hamden, CT: Archon, 1963 
Quinn, David B & Quinn, Alison M, The English New England Voyages 1602–1608, The Hakluyt Society Series II, Vol 161, 1983.
Venn: Alumni Cantab, 1921
Westby-Gibson, John: John Brereton, in Dictionary of National Biography, 1885

English explorers
English explorers of North America
1570s births
1630s deaths
English chroniclers
16th-century English writers
16th-century male writers
17th-century English writers
16th-century American people
17th-century American writers
17th-century English male writers
John
Explorers of the United States
People educated at Norwich School
English male non-fiction writers